Society of Nepali Architects(SONA) is an independent non-profit association of architectures in Nepal. It was established in 1990. It has collaboration with the ARCASIA, SAARCH, and UIA.

Objectives
 promote the development of architecture and its related art, science and technology throughout Nepal
 promote the companionship, kindness and support within the architects and to safeguard their professional rights and interests
 increase the participation of the national architects in the national development
 enhance the professional ideals among the members
 develop relations, fellowship and goodwill with international architect’s associations and institutions

Activities
 It organizes an Architecture Festival annually in Nepal
 It was involved in reconstruction work in association with the American Institute of Architects after the Gorkha earthquake.
It hosted the 14th regional assembly of South Asian architects in 2016.

External links
official website

References

Scientific organisations based in Nepal
Professional associations based in Nepal
1990 establishments in Nepal
Engineering organizations in Nepal